The 1941 Singapore Open, also known as the 1941 Singapore Badminton Championships, took place from 19 July – 24 August 1941 at the Clerical Union Hall in Balestier, Singapore. The ties were played over July and August with the first round ties being played on the 19 of July and the finals been played over the weekend on 23rd and 24 August.

Venue
Clerical Union Hall

Final results

References 

Singapore Open (badminton)
1941 in badminton